Karin Pettersen (born November 21, 1964 in Frosta) is a Norwegian team handball player and Olympic medalist. She received silver medals at the 1988 Summer Olympics in Seoul with the Norwegian national team, and at the 1992 Summer Olympics in Barcelona. 
Karin Pettersen played 250 games for the national team during her career, scoring 546 goals.

References

External links

1964 births
Living people
Norwegian female handball players
Olympic silver medalists for Norway
People from Frosta
Olympic medalists in handball
Medalists at the 1992 Summer Olympics
Medalists at the 1988 Summer Olympics
Handball players at the 1988 Summer Olympics
Handball players at the 1992 Summer Olympics
Sportspeople from Trøndelag
20th-century Norwegian women